This is a list of the named geological faults affecting the rocks of Ireland. Those of Northern Ireland are listed elsewhere.

Terminology
See the main article on faults for a fuller treatment of fault types and nomenclature but in brief, the main types are normal faults, reverse faults, thrusts or thrust faults and strike-slip faults.

Key to table
Column 1 indicates the name of the fault. Note that different authors may deploy different names for one and the same feature, or a part of a feature. Conversely the same name may be applied to two different features, particularly in the case of smaller faults with a wide geographic separation.
Column 2 indicates the county in which the fault occurs. Some traverse two or more counties of course.
Column 3 indicates the Irish grid reference for the approximate midpoint of the fault (as mapped). Note that the mapped extent of a fault may not correspond to its actual extent.
Column 4 indicates on which sheet of the Geological Survey of Ireland's 1:50,000 scale geological map series of Ireland, the fault is shown and named (either on map/s or cross-section/s or both).
Column 5 indicates a selection of publications in which references to the fault may be found. See references section for full details of publication.

Tabulated list of faults

References
 GeolDinglePen = Higgs, K. and Williams, B. 2018 Geology of the Dingle Peninsula, 2018 (guide and 1:50,000 scale geological map)

See also
 List of geological faults of Northern Ireland 

Geology of Ireland
Structural geology